Chris Kelly (c. 1890 – August 19, 1929) was an American jazz trumpeter born in Plaquemines Parish, Louisiana, United States, on 'Deer Range Plantation', best known for his early contributions on the New Orleans jazz scene.  Throughout the 1920s, he was a regular collaborator with clarinetist George Lewis. No photographs or recordings have survived of Kelly.

References

Bibliography
 Carr, Ian; Fairweather, Digby; Priestley, Brian. Jazz: The Rough Guide. Penguin, 1995. .

1890s births
1929 deaths
Jazz musicians from New Orleans
American jazz trumpeters
American male trumpeters
20th-century American musicians
20th-century trumpeters
20th-century American male musicians
American male jazz musicians